Forsthaus Falkenau is a German television series.

See also
List of German television series

External links
 

1980s German television series
1990s German television series
2000s German television series
2010s German television series
1989 German television series debuts
2013 German television series endings
Television shows set in Bavaria
German-language television shows
ZDF original programming